Morpheis mathani is a moth in the family Cossidae. It was described by Schaus in 1901. It is found from Mexico to Brazil and Peru.

References

Natural History Museum Lepidoptera generic names catalog

Zeuzerinae
Moths described in 1901